There have been four baronetcies created for persons with the surname Bruce, two in the Baronetage of Nova Scotia and two in the Baronetage of the United Kingdom. Two of the creations are extant as of 2010.

The Bruce Baronetcy, of Stenhouse in the County of Clackmannan, was created in the Baronetage of Nova Scotia on 29 September 1628 for William Bruce, with remainder to his heirs male whatsoever. He was a descendant of Sir Robert Bruce of Clackmannan (14th century), who was also the ancestor of the ancestor of the Earls of Elgin. The eleventh Baronet was an author and adventurer.

Michael Bruce (1823–1883), grandson of Patrick Craufurd Bruce, fifth son of the sixth Baronet, was a general in the British Army. His grandson Ian Robert Craufurd George Mary Bruce (1890–1956) was a brigadier in the Queen's Own Cameron Highlanders. Michael Robert Bruce (1832–1893), second son of William Cunningham Bruce, second son of the seventh Baronet, was a major-general in the British Army. Alexander James Bruce (1828–1906), eldest son of Alexander Fairlie Bruce, third son of the seventh Baronet, was a major-general in the Madras Army. Nigel Bruce, second son of the tenth Baronet and younger brother of the eleventh Baronet, was an actor. See also the Bruce-Clifton Baronetcy of Downhill and the Bruce Baronetcy of Dublin below.

The Bruce Baronetcy, of Balcaskie in Scotland, was created in the Baronetage of Nova Scotia on 21 October 1668 for the architect William Bruce. He was a descendant of Robert Bruce, brother of Edward Bruce, 1st Lord Bruce of Kinloss, ancestor of the Earls of Elgin. His son, the second Baronet, was one of the Scottish representatives to the 1st Parliament of Great Britain. The title became extinct on his death in 1710.

The Bruce, later Bruce-Clifton Baronetcy, of Downhill in the County of Londonderry, was created in the Baronetage of the United Kingdom on 29 June 1804 for Reverend Henry Bruce. He was a descendant of Patrick Bruce, younger brother of the first Baronet of the 1628 creation, and the brother of Sir Stewart Bruce, 1st Baronet, of Dublin (see below). The third Baronet was a Conservative politician. The fourth Baronet was High Sheriff of County Londonderry in 1903. The seventh Baronet assumed the additional surname of Clifton in 1997.

Sir Henry William Bruce (1792–1863), younger son of the first Baronet, was an admiral in the Royal Navy. His son by his second wife, James Minchin Bruce (1833–1901), was a rear-admiral in the Royal Navy.

The Bruce Baronetcy, of Dublin, was created in the Baronetage of the United Kingdom on 23 December 1812 for Stewart Bruce, Genealogist of the Order of St Patrick and Gentleman Usher of Dublin Castle. He was a descendant of Patrick Bruce, younger brother of the first Baronet of the 1628 creation, and the brother of Sir Henry Bruce, 1st Baronet, of Downhill (see above). The title became extinct on his death in 1841.

Bruce baronets, of Stenhouse (1628)

 Sir William Bruce, 1st Baronet (died 1630)
 Sir William Bruce, 2nd Baronet (1621–)
 Sir William Bruce, 3rd Baronet (died 1682)
 Sir William Bruce, 4th Baronet (died 1721)
 Sir Robert Bruce, 5th Baronet (died c. 1760)
 Sir Michael Bruce, 6th Baronet (died 1795)
 Sir Michael Bruce, 7th Baronet (died 1827)
 Sir Michael Bruce, 8th Baronet (1796–1862)
 Sir William Cunningham Bruce, 9th Baronet (1825–1906)
 Sir William Waller Bruce, 10th Baronet (1856–1912)
 Sir Michael William Selby Bruce, 11th Baronet (1874–1957)
 Sir (Francis) Michael Ian Bruce, 12th Baronet (1926–2021)
Sir Michael Ian Richard Bruce, 13th Baronet (b, 1950)

The heir presumptive is the present holder’s half-brother Robert Dudley Bruce (b. 1952)

Bruce baronets, of Balcaskie (1668)
 Sir William Bruce, 1st Baronet (c. 1630 – 1710)
 Sir John Bruce, 2nd Baronet (died 1711)

Bruce, later Bruce-Clifton baronets, of Downhill (1804)

 Sir Henry Hervey Aston Bruce, 1st Baronet (died 1822)
 Sir James Robertson Bruce, 2nd Baronet (1788–1836)
 Sir Henry Hervey Bruce, 3rd Baronet (1820–1907)
 Sir Hervey Juckes Lloyd Bruce, 4th Baronet (1843–1919)
 Sir Hervey Ronald Bruce, 5th Baronet (1872–1924)
 Sir Hervey John William Bruce, 6th Baronet (1919–1971)
 Sir Hervey James Hugh Bruce-Clifton, 7th Baronet (1952–2010)
 Sir Hervey Hamish Peter Bruce-Clifton, 8th Baronet (b. 1986)

The heir presumptive is the present holder’s half-brother Louis William Sinclair Bruce-Clifton (b. 1993)

Bruce baronets, of Dublin (1812)
 Sir Stewart Bruce, 1st Baronet (c. 1764 – 1841)

See also
 Earl of Elgin
 Bruce-Gardner baronets

Notes

References
Kidd, Charles, Williamson, David (editors). Debrett's Peerage and Baronetage (1990 edition). New York: St Martin's Press, 1990.

Baronetcies in the Baronetage of Nova Scotia
Baronetcies in the Baronetage of the United Kingdom
Extinct baronetcies in the Baronetage of Nova Scotia
Extinct baronetcies in the Baronetage of the United Kingdom
1628 establishments in Nova Scotia
1804 establishments in the United Kingdom